György Elek (born 2 May 1984) is a Hungarian former competitive ice dancer. With Zsuzsanna Nagy, he is a two-time national silver medalist. They competed in the final segment at four ISU Championships and also appeared on the senior Grand Prix series.

Personal life 
Elek was born on 2 May 1984 in Budapest, Hungary. He is the younger brother of Hungarian ice dancer Attila Elek.

Career 
Elek's partnership with Regina Szabo began by 2001. They competed at four ISU Junior Grand Prix events.

Elek teamed up with Zsuzsanna Nagy in the middle of the 2002–2003 season. The two qualified to the final segment at the 2003 World Junior Championships in Ostrava, Czech Republic, and the 2004 World Junior Championships in The Hague, Netherlands.

After moving up to the senior level, in the 2005–2006 season, Nagy/Elek appeared at two Grand Prix events and became two-time national silver medalists. They competed in the free dance at the 2006 European Championships in Lyon, France, and 2007 European Championships in Warsaw, Poland. They competed in the original dance at the 2007 World Championships in Tokyo, Japan, but did not advance to the free dance.

Nagy/Elek were coached by her parents, Sándor Nagy and Gabriella Remport. Their partnership ended around 2007.

Programs 
(with Nagy)

Competitive highlights
JGP: Junior Grand Prix

With Nagy

With Szabo

References

External links
 

Living people
Hungarian male ice dancers
1984 births
Figure skaters from Budapest